Ali Mohamed Abdulkadir is a Somali footballer who plays as a forward for Hilltop and the Somalia national team.

Club career
During the 2019–20 Spartan South Midlands Football League season, Abdulkadir made five league appearances for Hillingdon Borough, before joining Hilltop.

International career
On 15 June 2021, Abdulkadir made his debut for Somalia, in a 1–0 friendly loss against Djibouti.

Personal life
Abdulkadir is cousins with fellow Somalia international Liban Abdulahi.

References

Date of birth missing (living people)
Living people
Association football forwards
Hillingdon Borough F.C. players
Hilltop F.C. players
Somalian footballers
Somalia international footballers
Year of birth missing (living people)